Tiszafüred is a district in north-eastern part of Jász-Nagykun-Szolnok County. Tiszafüred is also the name of the town where the district seat is found. The district is located in the Northern Great Plain Statistical Region.

Geography 
Tiszafüred District borders with Mezőkövesd District (Borsod-Abaúj-Zemplén County) to the north, Balmazújváros District (Hajdú-Bihar County) to the east, Karcag District to the south, Kunhegyes District and Füzesabony District (Heves County) to the west. The number of the inhabited places in Tiszafüred District is 7.

Municipalities 
The district has 1 town and 6 villages.
(ordered by population, as of 1 January 2012)

The bolded municipality is the city.

Demographics

In 2011, it had a population of 19,559 and the population density was 47/km².

Ethnicity
Besides the Hungarian majority, the main minorities are the Roma (approx. 1,000) and German (200).

Total population (2011 census): 19,559
Ethnic groups (2011 census): Identified themselves: 17,758 persons:
Hungarians: 16,572 (93.32%)
Gypsies: 708 (3.99%)
Germans: 228 (1.28%)
Others and indefinable: 250 (1.41%)
Approx. 2,000 persons in Tiszafüred District did not declare their ethnic group at the 2011 census.

Religion
Religious adherence in the county according to 2011 census:

Catholic – 5,389 (Roman Catholic – 5,318; Greek Catholic – 71);
Reformed – 4,211;
Evangelical – 37; 
other religions – 248; 
Non-religious – 4,047; 
Atheism – 145;
Undeclared – 5,482.

Gallery

See also
List of cities and towns of Hungary

References

External links
 Postal codes of the Tiszafüred District

Districts in Jász-Nagykun-Szolnok County